Chalarus latifrons is a species of fly in the family Pipunculidae.

Distribution
Europe & North America.

References

Pipunculidae
Insects described in 1943
Diptera of Europe
Diptera of North America
Taxa named by D. Elmo Hardy